Shakhenat Rural District is in Shakhenat District of Birjand County, South Khorasan province, Iran. At the National Census of 2006, its population was 3,105 (as a part of the Central District) in 1,086 households. There were 2,909 inhabitants in 985 households at the following census of 2011. At the most recent census of 2016, the population of the rural district was 2,594 in 942 households. The largest of its 15 villages was Mahmuei, with 750 people. After the census, the rural district and Shakhen Rural District were separated from the Central District to establish Shakhenat District.

References 

Birjand County

Rural Districts of South Khorasan Province

Populated places in South Khorasan Province

Populated places in Birjand County